A tourist trolley, also called a road trolley, is a rubber-tired bus designed to resemble an old-style streetcar or tram, usually with false clerestory roof. The vehicles are usually fueled by diesel, or sometimes compressed natural gas.

The name refers to the American English usage of the word trolley to mean an electric streetcar. As these vehicles are not actually trolleys, and to avoid confusion with trolley buses,  the American Public Transportation Association (APTA) refers to them as "trolley-replica buses".

Use 
Tourist trolleys are used by both municipal and private operators.  Municipal operators may mix tourist trolleys in with the regular service bus fleet to add more visitor interest or attract attention to new routes. In many cities tourist trolleys are used as circulators. Tourist trolleys are also run by private operators to carry tourists to popular destinations.

In San Francisco, tourist trolleys mimic the city's famous cable cars.

Tourist trolleys sometimes operate in places which also have streetcars. For example, tourist trolleys operate in Philadelphia, which also has actual trolley service.

Operators 

Notable operators of tourist-trolley buses:
 New York Trolley Company
 Williamsburg Area Transit Authority – Local shopping centers and points of interest, including Merchants Square in Williamsburg, Virginia
 Capital Metropolitan Transit Authority – Dillo Routes in downtown Austin, Texas
 Erie Metropolitan Transit Authority – Bayliner Route in downtown Erie, Pennsylvania
 Gray Line Worldwide
 Kingston Citibus in Kingston, New York
 Montgomery Area Transit Service – Lightning Route Trolleys in Montgomery, Alabama
 Pace – circulator in the Chicago area
 Chicago Trolley & Double Decker Co. – Largest sightseeing/charter company in the Midwest
 Red Rose Transit Authority – circulator in downtown Lancaster, Pennsylvania (retired in 2019 and replaced with regular buses)
 Rhode Island Public Transit Authority – Providence LINK in downtown Providence, Rhode Island
 Transit Authority of River City – Louisville, Kentucky
 VIA Metropolitan Transit – VIA Streetcar in San Antonio, Texas
 Ollie the Trolley in Scottsdale, AZ circulator in Downtown Scottsdale
 Riverside Transit Agency – shuttle service in downtown Riverside, CA, Temecula, CA and around UC Riverside
 Molly's Trolley in West Palm Beach, Florida
 I-Ride Trolley in Orlando, Florida
 Sun Trolley in Fort Lauderdale, Florida
 TANK operates Southbound Shuttle, which circles the riverfront cities of Newport, Kentucky, Covington, Kentucky, and Cincinnati, Ohio.
 Wave Transit operates a circular tourist route in downtown Wilmington, NC.
 Capital Area Transportation Authority – Lansing, Michigan: Under the name "Route 4 Entertainment Express", limited-stop late-night weekend service between Downtown Lansing and downtown East Lansing catering to nightlife.
 Capital District Transportation Authority (CDTA) – Saratoga Visitors Trolley (Saratoga Springs, NY; from Memorial Day Weekend until Labor Day Weekend)
 Niagara Frontier Transportation Authority (NFTA); Route 55T Tourist Trolley along Pine Avenue in Niagara Falls, New York between Niagara Falls and the Niagara Falls International Airport.
 Housatonic Area Regional Transit in the past had a trolley service in downtown Danbury, but service was later suspended. HARTransit purchased a new trolley-replica bus in June 2014.
 Coast Transit Authority Beachcomber (1) and Casino Hopper (2) lines in Biloxi, Mississippi

Manufacturers

Current
 Cable Car Classics, Inc.
 Gillig Corporation
 Hometown Trolley
 Specialty Vehicles

Former
 Dupont Industries
 Optima Bus Corporation (formerly Chance Coach Inc.)

See also 
 Trackless train – tram in U.S. English.
 Trolleybus
 Heritage streetcar
 Duck tour – uses an amphibious vehicle for sightseeing''.
 List of buses

References

External links 

Tourist activities
Buses by type